Wettinia anomala is a species of flowering plant in the family Arecaceae. It is found in Colombia and Ecuador.

References

anomala
Flora of Colombia
Flora of Ecuador
Least concern plants
Least concern biota of South America
Taxonomy articles created by Polbot
Taxa named by Max Burret